Ashley Kahn is an American music historian, journalist, and producer. Kahn graduated from Columbia University in 1983.

In 2014, Kahn co-authored the autobiography of Carlos Santana, titled The Universal Tone: Bringing My Story To Light. To date, his most critically acclaimed books have been on two major jazz albums, Kind of Blue by Miles Davis and A Love Supreme by John Coltrane. He pens articles, interviews and other features on music, and is a prolific liner note writer for a variety of music labels, and for which he has earned three ASCAP/Deems Taylor awards, and three Grammy nominations. In 2015, he was awarded a Grammy for his album notes to the John Coltrane release Offering: Live at Temple University.

Bibliography
Rolling Stone: The Seventies, with Rolling Stone, Holly George-Warren, Shawn Dahl, 1998 for the first edition, Little Brown & Co, USA, 
The Rolling Stone Jazz & Blues Album Guide with John Swenson, 1999 for the first edition, Random House, 
Kind of Blue: The Making of the Miles Davis Masterpiece, foreword by Jimmy Cobb, 2001, Da Capo Press, USA, 
A Love Supreme: The Story of John Coltrane's Signature Album, foreword by Elvin Jones, 2002 for the first edition, Viking Penguin, USA, 
The House That Trane Built: The Story of Impulse Records. (2006) W. W. Norton, 
The Color of Jazz: Album Cover Photographs by Pete Turner. (2006) Rizzoli International, 
The Blue Note Years: The Photographs of Francis Wolff & Jimmy Katz. (2009) Jazzprezzo, 
The Universal Tone: Bringing My Story To Light — Carlos Santana's autobiography (2014) Little, Brown,

References

Further reading
New York Times, 2006
The Guardian, 2006
Entertainment Weekly, 2006
The Independent, 2002
Stereophile, 2002
Village Voice, 2002
Time, 2000
Detroit MetroTimes, 2000
JazzTimes, 2000
Interview on the Kind of Blue book
Official website of the A Love Supreme book
Interview on A Love Supreme book
Biography at National Public Radio
Writing about music. A talk with Ashley Kahn

American music critics
1960 births
Living people
New York University staff
Columbia College (New York) alumni
Grammy Award winners